Roger Guesnerie is an economist born in France in 1943. He is currently the Chaired Professor of Economic Theory and Social Organization of the Collège de France, Director of Studies at the  École des hautes études en sciences sociales, and the chairman of the board of directors of the Paris School of Economics.

Career

Guesnerie studied at École Polytechnique and the École Nationale des Ponts et Chaussées, and received his doctorate in economics from the University of Toulouse in 1982. He has taught at the London School of Economics, the École Polytechnique, and at Harvard University. Guesnerie has published widely in economics, including in public economics, in the theory of incentives and economic mechanisms, and in the theory of general economic equilibrium.

Honors and responsibilities

Guesnerie has been elected president of several scholarly societies, notably the French Association of Economic Sciences  (2002–2003), the  Econometric Society (1996), and the European Economic Association (1994). Guesnerie has been elected as a foreign honorary member of the American Economic Association and as a foreign member of the American Academy of Arts and Sciences. He has served as co-editor of Econometrica (1984–1989) and as foreign editor of the Review of Economic Studies. In France, Guesnerie's research has been recognized with the CNRS Silver Medal; he has been declared to be a Chevalier de l'Ordre National du Mérite and Chevalier de la Légion d'honneur.

Publications

Books
 Roger Guesnerie and Henry Tulkens, 2008, The Design of Climate Policy, MIT Press.
 "Assessing Rational Expectations 2: Eductive stability in economics", MIT Press, 2005, 453p.
 "Assessing Rational Expectations: Sunspot multiplicity and economic fluctuations", MIT Press, 2001, 319 p.
 "A contribution to the pure theory of taxation", Cambridge University Press, 1995, 301 pages

Papers
 
  with 
 Donald J. Brown credited Guesnerie's "seminal" paper with the "major methodological innovation in the general equilibrium analysis of firms with pricing rules", "the introduction of the methods of nonsmooth analysis, as a [synthesis] of global analysis (differential topology) and [of] convex analysis." This paper introduced cone of interior displacements of Dubovickii and Miljutin into economics.

 "General equilibrium when Some firms follow special pricing rules", (with Egbert Dierker and W. Neuefeind), Econometrica, 53, 6, 1985
This paper stimulated a subfield of economics, devoted to pricing rules, as discussed by Jacques Drèze:  "Starting with a paper in Econometrica by Dierker, Guesnerie and Neuefeind (1985), a theory of general equilibrium has developed for economies with non-convex production sets, where firms follow well-defined pricing rules. In particular, existence theorems of increasing generality cover (to some extent, because of various differences in assumptions) the case of Ramsey-Boiteux pricing. Those interested primarily in applications might express skepticism, perhaps even horrified skepticism, upon realizing that 90 pages of a serious economics journal—a 1988 issue of The Journal of Mathematical Economics—were devoted to existence proofs of equilibrium in non-convex economies, under alternative formulations of the assumption that  entails bounded losses at normalized prices. Still, I think that economic research must cover the whole spectrum from concrete applications to that level of abstraction."

References

External links
 Homepage of Roger Guesnerie (Paris School of Economics)

French civil engineers
École Polytechnique alumni
École des Ponts ParisTech alumni
Corps des ponts
Presidents of the Econometric Society
Academic staff of the Collège de France
Fellows of the American Academy of Arts and Sciences
General equilibrium theorists
Mathematical economists
Public economists
Microeconomists
Macroeconomists
Econometricians
Fellows of the Econometric Society
21st-century  French economists
20th-century  French  economists
1943 births
Living people